Bulger Geyser is located in the Upper Geyser Basin of Yellowstone National Park, Wyoming. It erupts frequently, with both major and minor eruptions. As with most geysers, the minor eruptions are the most common. They have a duration of seconds. Major eruptions are infrequent, but they have durations as long as 12 minutes. Either way, the play consists of somewhat vigorous bursting 1–12 feet high.

See also
List of Yellowstone geothermal features
Yellowstone National Park
Geothermal areas of Yellowstone

References

Geysers of Wyoming
Geothermal features of Teton County, Wyoming
Geothermal features of Yellowstone National Park
Geysers of Teton County, Wyoming